Ragne is a feminine given name. Notable people with the name include:

 Ragne Kytölä (born 1965), Finnish athlete
 Ragne Birte Lund (born 1949), Norwegian civil servant and diplomat
 Ragne Tangen (1927–2015), Norwegian children's television presenter
 Ragne Veensalu (born 1986), Estonian stage, film, and television actress
 Ragne Wiklund (born 2000), Norwegian long track speed skater and orienteer

Estonian feminine given names
Norwegian feminine given names
Finnish feminine given names